William Gardiner (1522–1558) was an English politician.

He was a Member (MP) of the Parliament of England for Barnstaple in March 1553.

References

1522 births
1558 deaths
English MPs 1553 (Edward VI)
Members of the Parliament of England (pre-1707) for Barnstaple